The Reina–Valera is a Spanish translation of the Bible originally published in 1602 until United Bible Societies in 1909 revised the earlier translation produced in 1569 by Casiodoro de Reina.. This translation was known as the "Biblia del Oso" (in English: Bear Bible) because the illustration on the title page showed a bear trying to reach a container of honeycombs hanging from a tree. Since that date, it has undergone various revisions notably those of 1602, 1862, 1909, 1960, 1977, 1995, and more recently in 2011.

History

Starting point
Casiodoro de Reina, a former Catholic monk of the Order of St. Jerome, and later an independent Lutheran theologian, with the help of several collaborators produced the Biblia del Oso, the first complete Bible printed in Spanish. (Earlier translations, such as the 13th-century Alfonsina Bible, translated from Jerome's Vulgate, had been copied by hand.) 

It was first published on September 28, 1569, in Basel, Switzerland. The translation was based on the Hebrew Masoretic Text (Bomberg's Edition, 1525) and the Greek Textus Receptus (Stephanus' Edition, 1550). As secondary sources, de Reina used the Ferrara Bible for the Old Testament and the Latin Edition of Santes Pagnino throughout. For the New Testament, he was greatly aided by the translations of Francisco de Enzinas and Juan Pérez de Pineda. The 1569 version included the deuterocanonical books within the Old Testament and the 1602 version included the deuterocanonical books sandwiched between the Old and New Testaments.

Edition by Cipriano de Valera
In 1602 Cipriano de Valera, a student of de Reina, published a revision of the Biblia del Oso which was printed in Amsterdam in which the deuterocanonical books were placed in a section between the Old and New Testaments called the Apocrypha. Among the reasons for the revision was the fact that in the intervening period words had changed their meanings or gone out of use. For a time, it was known simply by de Valera's name.

Further revisions
The British and Foreign Bible Society, the American Bible Society and the United Bible Societies published a total of fifteen revisions between 1808 and 1995 of which those of 1909, 1960 and 1995 are the most significant today and remain in print and a further revision appeared in 2011. Modern editions often omit the Apocrypha. The principle behind these revisions has been to remain as close to the original Reina–Valera as possible without causing confusion or misunderstanding. Even the 1995 New Testament is based on the traditional Textus Receptus despite the fact that the United Bible Societies use modern critical Greek texts as the basis for other translations. It retains the traditional form of the name of God, "Jehová" (with the notable exceptions of the Nueva Reina Valera 1990, revision which replaces "Jehová" with "El Eterno" and the Reina Valera Contemporánea, revision of 2011 which replaces "Jehová" with "El Señor").

In addition, it uses for the second-person plural the pronoun "vosotros" (except for the Reina Valera Contemporánea which replaces "vosotros" with "ustedes"), which is obsolete outside Spain. Apart from updating the vocabulary where necessary, its major innovations lie in the area of visual presentation: Hebrew verse is printed in a way that reflects its structure rather than as if it were prose, and while the numbering of verses has been retained the text is laid out clearly in paragraphs.

Since the resurgence of the King James Only movement in the United States (and its exportation to other countries), there has been much debate among Christian groups who use the Reina–Valera Bible. However, the 1960 revision became the common Bible of many millions of Spanish-speaking Protestants around the world, surpassing the 1909 in its reception. Almost all Hispanic churches use it, despite further attempts to revise it (for example, the unofficial Reina–Valera-Gomez revision).

The Reina–Valera Bible is one of the Bible translations authorized to be used in Spanish-language services of the Church of Christ, Scientist, the Anglican Communion as well as by many religious groups.

Unofficial revisions 
 The 1602 Purified Bible done in Monterrey, Mexico, by advocates of King James Onlyism. The First edition was printed in 2001, with the Second Edition in 2002. Their purpose was to create (or rather, to restore) a Spanish-language bible which honored and remained true to the old Reina-Valera Castellan Spanish.
 The Reina–Valera 1865, made by Dr. Ángel H. de Mora of Spain, and subsequently printed by the American Bible Society. The ABS continued to reprint this Valera edition until the 1950s. It was reprinted again in the year 2000 by the Local Church Bible Publishers of Lansing, Michigan, and the Valera Bible Society of Miami, Florida.
 The Reina–Valera–Gómez Bible, a revision of the 1909, done in Matamoros, Mexico, by advocates of King James Onlyism. 
 The Trinitarian Bible Society has been working on a revision of the Valera 1909. 
 The Church of Jesus Christ of Latter-day Saints (Mormons) published in 2009 their first official Spanish edition of the Bible based on the 1909 Reina–Valera edition, with "a very conservative update of outdated grammar and vocabulary".

See also 

 Bible translations
 Bible translations into Spanish

References

Further reading
 Raymond S. Rosales. Casiodoro de Reina, patriarca del Protestantismo hispano, in Serie de monografías [de las] Publicaciones del Seminario Concordia, no. 5. Saint Louis, Mo.: Concordia Seminary Publications, 2002.

External links 
 Text of the Biblia del Oso (1569)
 Text of the Reina–Valera (1602)
 Text of the Reina–Valera (1865)
 Text of the Biblia Reina–Valera 1909
 Text of the Reina–Valera Antigua
 Text of the Reina–Valera 1960
 Text of the Reina–Valera 1977
 Text of the Reina–Valera 1995
 Text of the Reina–Valera Contemporánea
 Text of the Reina–Valera Gomez Bible. Revision 2004
 LDS Text of the "Santa Biblia: Reina–Valera 2009"
 History of Reina–Valera in Spanish by Baptist Church
 Website of the Reina–Valera Contemporánea (in Spanish)
 
 

Bible translations into Spanish
1569 books
Early printed Bibles